The yellow admiral or Australian admiral (Vanessa itea) is a butterfly native to Australia, New Zealand, Lord Howe Island, and Norfolk Islands. The yellow admiral is a member of the family Nymphalidae, the subfamily Nymphalinae as well as the tribe Nymphalini.

Description
It is a medium-sized butterfly, with a variable wingspan of 48 to 50 mm in Tasmania, and 48 to 55 mm in New Zealand. The upperside of the forewings are dark brown to black toward the outer edges, with three small white patches and a wide, bright yellow bar, and dull red nearer the body. The rear wings are dull red with a black border, and a row of black circles with light blue centres near the edge.

The underwings are very different - the rear wing is various shades of brown with cryptic, irregular markings; the underside of the forewing has a blue eyespot on a black background that is highlighted by a yellow area above and below.

Distribution and habitat
Yellow admirals are relatively common throughout their range wherever their food plants occur. They prefer open country, wastelands and gardens where the stinging nettles, Urtica incisa and Urtica urens are present. It is found at up to 1000 m above sea level.

It is a strong, fast flier, and is thought to survive wind-blown travel from Australia to New Zealand, across the Tasman Sea.

Life cycle

Eggs
The eggs are light green, ribbed and barrel shaped. They are usually laid singly, sometimes in pairs, onto the nettle leaves that the larva will eat.

Larva
The caterpillars vary from black to grey, yellow-green or brown, with lighter coloured lines and spots running laterally along its back. They are covered in several rows of spiny protrusions. They have six true legs, and ten prolegs.

They prefer to eat nettles and, depending upon availability, feed on Urtica incisa, Urtica urens, Parietaria debilis, Pipturus argenteus, Parietaria australis, Parietaria cardiostegia, Parietaria judaica, and Soleirolia soleirolii. They feed at night; during the day they hide in a curled leaf for protection.

They grow to about 30 mm long before pupating. The pupa is about 20 mm long and is grey or brownish, with sharp bumps and has two white/silver spots on each side.

Adult

The flight period of the adult covers all the warmer months of the year and so varies with location, e.g. in Tasmania it is from November to May, while in Victoria it is from September to April. Individuals may live for several months. The adults feed on nectar from available flowers, and sometimes sap seepage from trees. Normally the last of the season's brood survive as larvae until the next season, but in some areas it survives as a dormant adult over winter.

Parasites

In New Zealand the yellow admiral pupae have been parasitised by both the self introduced wasp species Echthromorpha intricatoria as well as the introduced wasp Pteromalus puparum.

See also
Butterflies of New Zealand

References

External links

Detailed description, and pages of pictures of larva and eggs

Butterflies of Australia
Butterflies of New Zealand
Vanessa (butterfly)
Butterflies described in 1775
Taxa named by Johan Christian Fabricius